Elections to Liverpool Town Council were held on Wednesday 1 November 1840. One third of the council seats were up for election, the term of office of each councillor being three years.

All of the sixteen wards were contested.

After the election, the composition of the council was:

Election result

Ward results

* - Retiring Councillor seeking re-election

Abercromby

Castle Street

Everton

Exchange

Great George

Lime Street

North Toxteth

Pitt Street

Rodney Street

St. Anne Street

St. Paul's

St. Peter's

Scotland

South Toxteth

Vauxhall

West Derby

See also
Liverpool Town Council elections 1835 - 1879
Liverpool City Council elections 1880–present
Mayors and Lord Mayors 
of Liverpool 1207 to present
History of local government in England

References

1840
1840 English local elections
November 1840 events
1840s in Liverpool